Perfect Night In is a British three-part comedy-based clip show that was broadcast between 6 and 27 May 2007 on Channel 4. The shows evolve around comedy acts talking about and discussing their favourite television material during their childhood, ranging from children's television to Saturday evening entertainment. Each show lasted for 130 minutes, and were followed by shows briefly relating to the marathon that has just been broadcast, either relating to the act's previous work, or favourite material from the act. The first two editions featured established double acts; the final edition was presented solely by Lenny Henry (although his brother did make an appearance), and also notably featured an entirely different set from the first two editions (possibly indicating that, with these changes, it may have been the original pilot for the series).

The shows that were broadcast are:
 
 Lucas and Walliams' Perfect Night In (Broadcast 6 May 2007) followed by Stand By Me
 Frost and Pegg's Perfect Night In (Broadcast 13 May 2007) followed by a double bill of Spaced
 Lenny Henry's Perfect Night In (Broadcast 20 May 2007) followed by High Anxiety

Channel 4 comedy